Perth College may refer to:

Perth College UHI, college of higher education in Perth, Scotland
Perth College (Western Australia), an Anglican girls' school in Perth, Western Australia